Shyne Coldchain II is the fourth official mixtape released by American rapper Vince Staples. The mixtape was produced by No I.D., Evidence, DJ Babu, Childish Major, and Scoop DeVille. It also features guest appearances from singer-songwriters Jhené Aiko, and James Fauntleroy.

Background 
Vince Staples began work on the project shortly after the release of his June 2013 collaborative effort with Pittsburgh, Pennsylvania native Mac Miller. Stolen Youth.

In an October 2013 interview, he told Complex:

On February 18, 2014, Staples revealed both the cover artwork and track listing for the mixtape.

On March 20, 2014, A music video was released via YouTube for the song "Nate."

On December 5, 2014 Amazon Music combined and reordered the tracks from Stolen Youth and Shyne Coldchain Vol. 2 and released them as an updated version of Stolen Youth (same name and artwork).

Critical reception 

Upon its release, Shyne Coldchain II was met with acclaim from music critics. Complex named it the twenty-second best album of the first half of 2014. Writing for them, Dharmic X said, "Producing over half of the project, No I.D. supplied his new signee at Def Jam with a hard, aggressive soundscape that isn't rooted in nostalgia of any sort. But what impresses most here is Vince's lyrical maturity. He proves to be an adept storyteller on songs like "Nate," which describes his dad's drug addiction, and "Earth Science," where he talks about a high-school romance that left an empty place in his heart."

Track listing  
 All tracks are written by Vince Staples

References

2014 mixtape albums
Vince Staples albums
Albums produced by No I.D.
Albums produced by Evidence (musician)
Albums produced by Scoop DeVille
Sequel albums